Roberto Carmona (born 17 September 1969) is a Mexican hurdler. He competed in the men's 110 metres hurdles at the 1988 Summer Olympics.

References

1969 births
Living people
Athletes (track and field) at the 1988 Summer Olympics
Mexican male hurdlers
Olympic athletes of Mexico
Place of birth missing (living people)